Serra Pelada is a 2013 Brazilian drama film co-written and directed by Heitor Dhalia, starring Juliano Cazarré, Júlio Andrade, Sophie Charlotte, Wagner Moura, and Matheus Nachtergaele.

The film follows the story of two men in Serra Pelada, one of the largest mines in the world.

Plot
The friends Juliano (Juliano Cazarré) and Joaquim (Júlio Andrade) leave São Paulo in search of the dream of gold. The year is 1978. The two arrive at the Amazon jungle as so many other thousands of men arrived. Full of dreams and illusions. But life in the camp changes everything. The obsession with wealth and power destroys them. Juliano becomes a gangster. Joaquim leaves all his values behind.

Cast

Juliano Cazarré as Juliano
Júlio Andrade as Joaquim
Sophie Charlotte as Thereza
Wagner Moura as Lindo Rico
Matheus Nachtergaele as Carvalho
Eline Porto as Izabel
Lyu Arisson as Marcelo
Edmilson Cordeiro as Josias
Silvero Pereira as Severino
Démick Lopes as Maria Y
Jesuíta Barbosa as Navalhada
Adriano Barroso as Lindomar
Rose Tuñas as Bereka
Alysson Amaral as Caboclo
Oswaldo Eugênio as Nego Diamante
Leonel Ferreira as Felicio

Production

Development
The director Heitor Dhalia said to UOL that Serra Pelada was the hardest movie he ever made. "When I had the idea of the film, I thought: ' why had nobody thought of doing this movie before? ' And when I was filming I understood why. It was almost impossible to be done. It was very complex. It was the hardest film I've ever done".

According to Dhalia, it was hard to tell the story of a camp which focused on men living in precarious conditions and facing orders from the owners of the operating areas.
"We're talking about a fairly important Brazilian event of our recent history. The biggest gold rush of the modern era. Highest concentration of manual labor since the pyramids of Egypt, which had 4,000 men. In Serra Pelada there were around 100,000 men working".

Filming
The film was going to be shot in Pará, but ended up being filmed in Paulínia, São Paulo, after Vale and the Amazonian State Government denied support for the production.

The producer Tatiana Quintella confirmed that Vale vetoed the filming in Pará, but explained that running the production there would be unworkable. "We had no budget for the logistics and security of our team. So we decided to shoot the film in São Paulo".

References

External links 
 

2013 films
Brazilian drama films
Gold mining in Brazil
Films shot in Paulínia
Films directed by Heitor Dhalia
Films set in the 1970s
Films about mining
2013 drama films
2010s Portuguese-language films